Joseph Thomson (27 May 1877 – 1 August 1953) was an Australian cricketer. He played in twenty-two first-class matches for Queensland between 1905 and 1921.

See also
 List of Queensland first-class cricketers

References

External links
 

1877 births
1953 deaths
Australian cricketers
Queensland cricketers
Cricketers from Brisbane